William Allen Garrett (July 27, 1854 – June 21, 1951) was an American lawyer and Democratic politician who served as a member of the Virginia Senate from 1901 to 1940.

References

External links

1854 births
1951 deaths
Democratic Party members of the Virginia House of Delegates
Democratic Party Virginia state senators